Minuscule 277 (in the Gregory-Aland numbering), ε 166 (Soden), is a Greek minuscule manuscript of the New Testament, on parchment. Paleographically it has been assigned to the 11th century. 
It has marginalia.

Description 

The codex contains the text of the four Gospels on 261 parchment leaves. The text is written in one column per page, in 22 lines per page.

There is also a division according to the Ammonian Sections (in Mark 234, the last section in 16:9), whose numbers are given at the margin with references to the Eusebian Canons.

Some portions (Synaxarion, Menologion, and pictures) were supplied by a later hand.

Text 

The Greek text of the codex is a representative of the Byzantine text-type. Hermann von Soden classified it to the textual family K1. Aland placed it in Category V.

According to the Claremont Profile Method it represents textual family Kx in Luke 1 and Luke 20, and belongs to the cluster Ω. In Luke 10 no profile was made.

History 

The manuscript was added to the list of New Testament manuscripts by Scholz (1794-1852). 
It was examined and described by Paulin Martin. C. R. Gregory saw the manuscript in 1885.

The manuscript is currently housed at the Bibliothèque nationale de France (Gr. 81 A) at Paris.

See also 

 List of New Testament minuscules
 Biblical manuscript
 Textual criticism

References

Further reading 

 

Greek New Testament minuscules
11th-century biblical manuscripts
Bibliothèque nationale de France collections